Annie Elizabeth Hoyle (1851–1931) was an artist from West Virginia who worked in the United States Forest Service from 1908 until 1930. She illustrated The Pine Trees of the Rocky Mountain Region by botanist George Sudworth.

Early life and education 
Annie Elizabeth Hoyle was born on a farm near Charles Town, West Virginia. She attended the Rouzee School of Fine Arts in Washington, DC, and then relocated to New York City to study under George H. Story at the National Academy of Design. Hoyle studied plant morphology and botany at the US National Museum of Natural History and at the Bureau of Plant Industry, under Joseph Painter and Ivar Tidestrom.

Career 
Hoyle started working for the Forest Service in 1908. She created over 160 drawings of range plants for the Division of Range Research during her twenty-year career. Hoyle began working at the Forest Service after the age of 50. She requested five extensions of time upon reaching retirement age, and ultimately stayed in the job until she retired on August 31, 1930, at the age of 80.

References 

1851 births
1931 deaths
Artists from West Virginia
Botanical illustrators
People from Charles Town, West Virginia
United States Forest Service officials
National Academy of Design alumni
20th-century American women artists